Patrick Daniel Bourque (born March 23, 1947 in Worcester, Massachusetts) is a retired American professional baseball player, a first baseman in Major League Baseball who played for three teams in a four-year MLB career. Bourque hit a home run in his first at-bat against the Expos in Montreal while playing for the Cubs.

Career
Bourque graduated from St. John's High School of Shrewsbury in 1965 and attended Holy Cross. In 1968 he played collegiate summer baseball with the Falmouth Commodores of the Cape Cod Baseball League and was named a league all-star. He was selected by the Chicago Cubs in the 33rd round of the 1969 MLB Draft. 

Bourque made his professional debut in 1971 with the Cubs, and went on to play parts of three seasons with the franchise. He had a successful minor league tenure, winning the American Association MVP in 1972 while playing with the Evansville Triplets.  Midway through the 1973 season, Chicago traded Bourque to the Oakland Athletics for fellow first baseman Gonzalo Marquez.  He spent a season with Oakland before being traded to the Minnesota Twins in another summer deal.  Oakland received Jim Holt in return.  Oakland reacquired Bourque following the 1974 season, trading Dan Ford and a minor leaguer to the Twins.  Ford went on to play for eleven seasons in the majors, while Bourque didn't play another major league game.

Known to his teammates as being a "foodie," he was most famous for his quip "I like eggs."

References

External links

1947 births
Living people
American Association (1902–1997) MVP Award winners
American expatriate baseball players in Mexico
Baseball players from Worcester, Massachusetts
Chicago Cubs players
Diablos Rojos del México players
Falmouth Commodores players
Huron Cubs players
Major League Baseball first basemen
Minnesota Twins players
Oakland Athletics players
Quincy Cubs players
San Antonio Missions players
Tacoma Cubs players
Tucson Toros players
Wichita Aeros players